The Malians in France, are French people of Malian origin.

History                           
The first Malian immigrants came to France in the 1960s. At first, there were male workers from rural regions who came to find long-term employment in France. Then, in the 1970s, there were Family reunification's, in which the wives and children of previous male immigrants came to live in France as well.

Origins                              
Most Malians in France are rural migrants who came from the Senegal River valley, and from the region of Kayes at the extreme south of Mali, a very poor and arid region, at the frontier with Senegal and Mauritania.

Notable people                   

 Moussa Sissoko, footballer
 Mohamed Sissoko, footballer
 Moussa Sylla
 Yacouba Sylla, footballer 
 Moussa Diaby, footballer
 Moussa Dembele, footballer 
 N'Golo Kanté, footballer
 Aya Nakamura, singer
 Aïssatou Tounkara, footballer
 Kadidiatou Diani, footballer
 Djibril Sidibé, footballer
Alassane Pléa, footballer

References            

Society of France
 
African diaspora in France
Immigration to France by country of origin